

Allerseelen is the musical project of the Austrian musician Gerhard Petak, also known as Kadmon and Gerhard Hallstatt. Briefly a group in 1987, it has been a solo project since 1989; Petak collaborates with groups for performances. His music is experimental, sometimes post-industrial and military pop and has often fallen into the neo-folk and pagan rock categories. He is known for his use of lyrics by Nazi authors, and has also written admiringly of Nazi cultural figures and collaborated with right-wing extremist musicians.

Allerseelen's recordings have been issued on the private label Aorta, with various distributors, and since 2004 on Ahnstern, a collaboration with Steinklang, a Salzburg imprint. Album design is by Stefan Alt, known as Salt; several have cover art by the Bulgarian artists HaateKaate. Petak has also published his writing as a periodical titled Ahnstern, formerly Aorta.

History

Until 2001, Petak used the name Kadmon, from the kabbalistic Adam Kadmon. In the 1980s he played drums for Michael DeWitt's Zero Kama  and at one appearance of Hermann Nitsch's Orgien Mysterien Theater. In 1987 he founded Allerseelen as his own group, named for the Catholic festival of All Souls' Day and also for the song by Richard Strauss and a chapter in Blue of Noon by George Bataille. The group soon broke up, and in 1989 it became a solo project.

After a series of cassettes, in 1993 Petak released his first CD, Cruor, a purely instrumental compilation of work since 1989 with a Mithraic and shamanistic focus and cover art of an underground temple. He described his work then as "technosophic music" and its style drew on Tibetan ritual music as well as bands including Throbbing Gristle; instruments used in the album include bone flutes, violin, and metallic percussion. Zillo reviewed the work as "a good mixture of folk-influenced and more experimental songs".

The 1995 album Gotos=Kalanda is a setting of a cycle of twelve love-poems by the Nazi esoteric philosopher and SS officer Karl Maria Wiligut on the subject of the Germanic months, and depicts on its cover the black sun mosaic from the SS fortress Wewelsburg, which Allerseelen have also used as an emblem. The album gave Allerseelen a reputation for glorifying Nazism. Allerseelen have also released records in collaboration with Storm, the right-wing musician Michael Moynihan's label. Petak has said that he was undermining the lyrics on Gotos=Kalanda with dissonant settings, and in the 2005 reissue on LP, added a setting of Ernst Busch's "Lied der Gefangenen" (Prisoners' Song), which was supposedly circulated among the concentration camp prisoners who worked under Himmler renovating the Wewelsburg.

Sturmlieder, Allerseelen's next album, appeared in 1997 and in addition to "In Stahlgewittern", inspired by Ernst Jünger's memoir of the First World War, includes "Leichenfarbne Dämmerung", which quotes from Nietzsche's Thus Spake Zarathustra, "Heiliges Blut", inspired by Alejandro Jodorowsky's film Santa Sangre, and "Sturmlied", sung by Ostara, which quotes the poem of the same name by Ricarda Huch and was a hit. The cover picture is of a sculpture of Odin by Bernhard Hoetger, an Expressionist whose work was suppressed by the Nazis.

In the following album, Stirb und Werde, issued in 1999, the guest singer was Sabine, who became a long-term collaborator with Allerseelen. Some of the tracks were reissues, including "Alle Lust will Ewigkeit", from a 7" record published in homage to Leni Riefenstahl's film The Blue Light, and "Feuertaufe", from a French Mithraic compilation. Others were inspired by or pay homage to Jünger, Nietzsche, Julius Evola, and Igor Stravinsky; the printed material quotes the French philosopher Jean Baudrillard and includes images from the occult film Lucifer Rising.

With Neuschwabenland (2000, named for an expedition to the Antarctic carried out by the Nazi regime in 1938–39) Petak announced a shift from dissonance to "fin de siècle military pop", which has been credited as the first use of the term. Tracks are based on or refer to among others Jünger (who is quoted on the cover), Hermann Hesse and his wife Ninon Hesse, the Icelandic heathen poet Sveinbjörn Beinteinsson, the tango composer Astor Piazzolla, and in titles, a book on esoteric Hitlerism by Miguel Serrano and Where the Wild Things Are by Maurice Sendak.

Venezia, Allerseelen's 2001 album, includes lyrics by Nietzsche (his poem "Venedig") as well as Rainer Maria Rilke, Ezra Pound, and Jean Cocteau.

In 2002 Allerseelen issued Abenteuerliches Herz, again drawing on Jünger, including for its title, but described by Petak as harking back to the French poètes maudits he enjoyed in his youth. The album includes a new version of "Santa Sangre" and a neo-folk adaptation of Iggy Pop's "Shoeshine Girl", to new lyrics by Petak. It has Spanish colour in the musical treatments and was the result of collaboration with Spanish groups: Circe and the Catalan musician Demian's project Ô Paradis. There is also percussion by the Moroccan group Rubbayat. The cover photo of a Megalithic monument in Spain is by the Vienna erotic photographer Helmut Wolech. At this time Petak backed up Demian on the album Serpiente de Luna, Serpiente de Sol, which appeared on Aorta, and adopted the professional name Gerhard.

Flamme, released in 2003, incorporates classical strings and includes lyrics by Friedrich Hölderlin, Novalis, and Juan Ramón Jiménez as well as the rune-mystic Friedrich Bernhard Marby, and another song was inspired by an alchemical work by Serrano. The album's cover quote is again from Nietzsche.

Also in 2003 Petak released Wir rufen deine Wölfe, a collaboration with Moynihan's band Blood Axis, Ô Paradis, and Waldteufel based on work by the German mystic and anti-Nazi Friedrich Hielscher.

Heimliche Welt and Gefiederte Träume were 2004 reissues on LP of Allerseelen music first issued as far back as 1989.

Edelweiss, issued in December 2005, is a compilation of tracks, many reworked in less harsh style, with Rosa, Gaya, Josef, and M. Precht as guest vocalists. A reviewer noted that Petak's newer compositions were often inspired by Megalithic monuments.

In 2007 Allerseelen released Hallstatt, Petak's first album of substantially new music since Abenteuerliches Herz. Using only male voices, and except for one song in English, only German, with lyrics by Goethe, Hermann von Gilm, Christian Friedrich Hebbel, Hermann Hesse, Friedrich Hölderlin, Alfred Kubin, and Nietzsche, it has an Austrian focus; the cover photo is of skulls in the chapel at Hallstatt. A reviewer noted that Petak was now calling his music krautpop or "industrial Folklore", and criticised his over-repetition of samples from "obscure recordings" to build atmosphere and for rhythmic purposes. With this album, Petak began using the name Gerhard Hallstatt.

The 2010 album Rauhe Seelen struck a reviewer as more romantic than previous Allerseelen releases, with a less jagged use of electronic sampling. The reviewer also noted that frequent collaborators with Allerseelen such as Dimo Dimov of the Bulgarian group Svarrogh and Marcel P. of the German group Miel Noir were in effect coalescing into a band.

Allerseelen's following album, Terra Incognita, so named according to Petak because he did not know at the outset how it would turn out, was released in 2015 and includes reworkings of old tracks as well as new material, with lyrics by Nietzsche, Goethe, and Richard Wagner and several guest artists: John Haughm of Agalloch, Jörg B. of Der Blutharsch, Daniel P. of Arnica, Alexander Wieser of Hrefnesholt, and Robert N. Taylor of Changes. The album is illustrated with mountain photographs by Petak; the cover image is of a memorial chapel to Empress Elisabeth of Austria.

Dunkelgraue Lieder, released in 2017, consists of digitally remastered, shortened versions of the tracks from Sturmlieder with the addition of the original and new versions of two songs that Allerseelen recorded for Agalloch's 2011 album Whitedivisiongrey, and three other new songs. The album is illustrated with photographs that Petak took in Oregon in 2010.

The album Chairete Daimones (Ancient Greek for "Welcome, daemons") was released in 2019 and titled for a libation invocation revived by Nietzsche in 1871. In addition to Nietzsche, Wiligut, and Ninon Hesse, it includes lyrics by Elisabeth of Austria, Aleister Crowley, Walter Flex, Yrjö von Grönhagen, Yves Kéler, Gotthold Ephraim Lessing, Anaïs Nin, Ferdinand Raimund, Knud Rasmussen, Isabelle Sandy, and Petak's girlfriend, Aida de Acosta. A reviewer noted that the coalescence of Allerseelen into a group continued, with Marcel P. and Estella Plunket of Miel Noir appearing once more, together with other guest artists including Thomas Bøjden of Die Weisse Rose, Aki Cederberg of Halo Manash, and the Algerian singer Faye R.

Discography

Albums and EPs

Other media
Petak has also published writings in periodical form as Ahnstern, previously Aorta. Issues have included studies of cultural figures of the Nazi era including Wiligut, Riefenstahl, Otto Rahn, and Evola, and in one Petak praised the Romanian Iron Guard as a "spiritual movement with the objective of combating mechanistic materialism (Panzermaterialismus) and all world views that elevate the material over the spiritual". A 1993 issue covers the supposed magical defence of England from the Luftwaffe by English witches, which is also the unifying theme of Sturmlieder. Ahnstern suspended publication after 29 issues; a compilation of material was published in English as Blutleuchte in 2010, and in French in 2011.

He also contributed to right-wing publications such as the German newspaper Staatsbriefe, and along with other European neo-pagan musicians including Moynihan, to a 2001 issue of Philippe Randa's right-wing French journal Dualpha dedicated to Evola. He has praised musicians who pursue a "Nordic Nietzscheanism", thus making Black Metal music into a "pagan avant-garde, a Nordic 'occulture'".

Early in the 21st century, the Bremen anti-right-wing project Grufties gegen Rechts Bremen evaluated Petak's writings, use of symbolism and sources in his music, and collaborations and judged him to be "an innovative right-wing culture warrior who should be taken seriously", but with a "self-contained" and "ethnically pluralistic" view of the world, neither a "fascist bully-boy" nor a "nostalgic fan of Hitler".

References

Further reading
 Andreas Diesel and Dieter Gerten. Looking for Europe: The History of Neofolk. Trans. Markus Wolff. Zeltingen-Rachtig: Index, 2013. .

External links
Allerseelen on MySpace

Austrian industrial music groups
Neofolk music groups
Martial industrial groups